Cosy may refer to

 Tea cosy, a cover for a teapot
 Cozy mystery, a subgenre of crime fiction
 Cosy catastrophe, post-apocalyptic science fiction style
 Correlation spectroscopy (COSY)
 CoSy (Conferencing System), an early computer conferencing system

See also
 Cozy (disambiguation)
 Koozie, a fabric or foam sleeve to thermally insulate a beverage container